Verres hageni is a beetle of the Family Passalidae. It belongs to class insecta and its order is Coleoptera.

References

External links

Passalidae